The Medical Center of Aurora ("TMCA") serves Aurora, Colorado and the eastern Denver-Aurora Metropolitan Area (metro area) with four separate campuses providing a wide range of health care services.  It was founded in 1974; it now employs more than 1,200 people and is part of HealthONE, the largest health care system in the metro area. Currently, there are more than 450 doctors on staff and 346 beds.

Services

Specialties for which The Medical Center of Aurora is best known locally and nationally include heart and vascular care, surgical services, women's services, cancer services, and neurosciences, including spine, brain and stroke care.

The center  is the only hospital in Colorado with a Level 1 Cardiac Center, which includes a Cardiac Alert Program, designed to train and equip first responders to more quickly and accurately detect and treat heart attacks, and serves as a model for other hospitals throughout the U.S.  These and other services have gained national respect and honors for outcomes and efficiencies

The center was the first health care organization in Colorado to offer Aquapheresis, a medical therapy that removes large volumes of excess fluid, designed to improve the quality of life for  patients with Congestive Heart Failure.

The center also offers robotic surgery using the Da Vinci Surgical System to perform a variety of minimally invasive surgeries.

Facilities

Main Campus, Aurora

North Campus, Aurora

Spalding Rehabilitation Hospital, Aurora

Centennial Medical Plaza, Centennial

Awards
 Ranked among the top 100 best place to work in the United States by Modern Healthcare.
 Magnet Recognition from the American Nurses Credential Center, the highest nursing honor in the country.
 The Alfred P. Sloan Award for Workplace Flexibility (2007 & 2008).
 Timberline Award from Colorado Performance Excellence.

Hospital rating data
The HealthGrades website contains the clinical quality data for the Medical Center of Aurora, as of 2017. For this rating section three different types of data from HealthGrades are presented: clinical quality ratings for thirty-three inpatient conditions and procedures, thirteen patient safety indicators and the percentage of patients giving the hospital as a 9 or 10 (the two highest possible ratings).

For inpatient conditions and procedures, there are three possible ratings: worse than expected, as expected, better than expected.  For this hospital the data for this category is:
Worse than expected - 5
As expected - 25
Better than expected - 3
For patient safety indicators, there are the same three possible ratings. For this hospital safety indicators were rated as:
Worse than expected - 0
As expected - 9
Better than expected - 4
Percentage of patients rating this hospital as a 9 or 10 - 74%
Percentage of patients who on average rank hospitals as a 9 or 10 - 69%

References

External links
The Medical Center of Aurora website
Modern Healthcare Top 100
Colorado Performance Excellence
List of Magnet Organizations
2008 Alfred P. Sloan Award Winners
2007 Alfred P. Sloan Award Winners
Timberline Award Winners

Hospital buildings completed in 1974
Hospitals in Colorado
HCA Healthcare
Hospitals established in 1974
1974 establishments in Colorado
Buildings and structures in Aurora, Colorado
Trauma centers